Nala Assembly constituency is an assembly constituency in  the Indian state of Jharkhand.

Overview
Nala Assembly constituency covers: Nala and Kundahit Police Stations in Jamtara district.
There are 242 towns and villages in Nala Block of Jamtara district, Jharkhand.

Nala Assembly constituency is part of Dumka (Lok Sabha constituency).

Members of Legislative Assembly 
2005: Rabindra Nath Mahato Yadav, Jharkhand Mukti Morcha
2009: Satyanand Jha, Bharatiya Janata Party
2014: Rabindra Nath Mahato, Jharkhand Mukti Morcha
2019: Rabindra Nath Mahato, Jharkhand Mukti Morcha

See also
Nala block
Kundhit block
List of states of India by type of legislature

References

Assembly constituencies of Jharkhand